Annie Hawks (May 28, 1836 - January 3, 1918) was an American poet and gospel hymnist who wrote a number of hymns with her pastor, Robert Lowry. She contributed to several popular Sunday school hymnbooks, and wrote the lyrics to a number of well-known hymns including: "I Need Thee Every Hour"; "Thine, Most Gracious Lord"; "Why Weepest Thou? Who Seekest Thou?"; "Full and Free Salvation" and "My Soul Is Anchored".

Early life and education
Annie Sherwood was born on May 28, 1836, in Hoosick, New York. Her ancestry on her father's side was English, and on her mother's side, remotely, Holland Dutch. She was educated in the public schools and in the Troy Seminary.

She never graduated from a school, but she always had a passion for books and read widely. By age 14, she was submitting poems to a local newspaper.

Career
The first poem which she published appeared in a Troy, New York, newspaper. That poem at once attracted attention and was followed by others which were printed in various local papers.

She married Charles Hial Hawks in 1857 or 1859, a member of a New York banking firm, and a resident of Hoosick. In January, 1865, the Hawks removed to Brooklyn. They attended the Hanson Place Baptist Church where Lowry was pastor. Lowry, himself a hymn-writer, encouraged Hawks to compose her own hymns.

In 1868, her pastor and friend, Rev. Dr. Robert Lowry, requested her to turn her attention to hymn writing, and her first hymns were written in that year. Among others, these included, "In the Valley", "Good Night", "Why Weepest Thou?", “Who'll Be the Next to Follow Jesus,” and “In the Valley.” Lowry set all of Hawks' hymns to music. Though Hawks was chiefly known as a writer of hymns, she also wrote many poems.

"I Need Thee Every Hour"

In 1872, the hymn by which Hawks is most widely known, "I Need Thee Every Hour", was written. It is said to have been translated into more foreign languages than any other modern hymn at the time of her death. Hawks stated:— "For myself, the hymn was prophetic rather than expressive of my own experiences, for it was wafted out to the world on the wings of love and joy, instead of under the stress of personal sorrow." Lowry, who wrote the music, went on to say: "I Need Thee Every Hour" was written by Mrs. Annie S. Hawks, in 1872, in Brooklyn, New York. I believe it was the expression of her own experience. It came to me in the form of five simple stanzas, to which I added the chorus to make it more serviceable. It inspired me at its first reading. It first appeared in a small collection of original songs prepared for the National Baptist Sunday-school Association, held in Cincinnati, Ohio in November, 1872, and was sung on that occasion."

Personal life

Hawks was the mother of three children. She identified with the Baptist denomination. After the death of her husband in 1888, she moved to Bennington, Vermont to live with her daughter and son-in-law. She died there on January 3, 1918, and is interred at the Hoosick Rural Cemetery.

References

Attribution

External links
 
 

1836 births
1918 deaths
19th-century American writers
19th-century American women writers
19th-century American women musicians
American lyricists
American women poets
American Christian hymnwriters
Christian poets
People from Brooklyn
Songwriters from New York (state)
American women hymnwriters
American women non-fiction writers
Wikipedia articles incorporating text from A Woman of the Century